Wetzstein is a mountain of southeastern Thuringia, Germany, part of the Thuringian Highland. It is located south of Lehesten. In 2004 the Altvaterturm was built on the summit, as a replica of the tower that stood on the mountain Praděd (northeastern Czech Republic) until 1959.

Mountains of Thuringia
Franconian Forest